Sir Laurence Sebrooke was the member of Parliament for the constituency of Gloucestershire for multiple parliaments from 1382 to 1390.

References 

Members of the Parliament of England for Gloucestershire
English MPs October 1382
Year of birth unknown
Year of death unknown
English knights
English MPs September 1388
English MPs January 1390